Wyoming Wildcat is a 1941 American Western film directed by George Sherman and written by Bennett Cohen and Anthony Coldeway. The film stars Don "Red" Barry, Julie Duncan, Frank M. Thomas, Syd Saylor, Dick Botiller and Edmund Cobb. The film was released on January 6, 1941, by Republic Pictures.

Plot
Soldier Bill Gannon returns to Wyoming after being released from service in the Spanish-American war, however when he gets there, he discovers that his father has turned into an outlaw due to the dishonesty and bad faith of others. His father still cares for him, and does not want him to be involved in the bandit life, so pushes him away. Bill moves somewhere else and gets a job has a guard on a stagecoach route, too bad it's the stagecoach his father's gang was about to steal.

Cast 
Don "Red" Barry as Bill Gannon
Julie Duncan as Terrie Carson
Frank M. Thomas as Frank Gannon
Syd Saylor as Butch McCord
Dick Botiller as Blackie Jordan
Edmund Cobb as Duke Edwards / Sam Collins
Ed Brady as Timmons
Ed Cassidy as Sheriff #2 
George Sherwood as Jackson

References

External links
 

1941 films
1940s English-language films
American Western (genre) films
1941 Western (genre) films
Republic Pictures films
Films directed by George Sherman
Films scored by William Lava
American black-and-white films
1940s American films